Delaware elected its member October 5, 1824.

See also 
 1824 and 1825 United States House of Representatives elections
 List of United States representatives from Delaware

References

1824
Delaware
United States House of Representatives